Lake Memphremagog is a fresh water glacial lake located between Newport, Vermont, United States and Magog, Quebec, Canada.  The lake spans both Quebec and Vermont, but is mostly in Quebec. Most of the watershed that feeds the lake is located in Vermont, and is a source for accumulated phosphorus, sediments, and other pollutants. Cleanup efforts since the late 1980s have improved the water quality. The lake furnishes potable water for 200,000 people.

Physical characteristics
However, three-quarters of its watershed, is in Vermont. In Vermont, the lake lies in parts of the towns of Derby and Newport, in addition to the City of Newport, all in Orleans County. In Quebec, the lake lies in parts of Austin, Magog, Ogden, Potton, Saint-Benoît-du-Lac, and Stanstead Township, all in Memphrémagog Regional County Municipality. The lake occupies most of what the Vermont Agency of Natural Resources calls "Basin 17". At the very south end of the lake, there is the South Bay, connected by the narrowest part of the lake.

The lake bottom takes a dramatic drop in Canada, starting opposite Mont Owl's Head and continuing that way north to Gibraltar Point, where it starts to climb back to the shallows of the north end. The lake is the third deepest in Vermont. It contains 21 islands. Province Island, the largest, is divided by the international border.
The lake is irregular in shape, and along its shores are several striking indentations, in some places low, and in some other parts high and rocky. Along the western shore of the lake are several mountains, prominent among which are Owl's Head, Elephantis, and the Hog's Back.

Islands 

There are twenty-one islands on Lake Memphremagog.  Of these, five are in the United States, one is international, and fifteen are in Canada.  Many of the islands have had several names throughout history; the current names are provided.

Islands in the United States 

 Horseneck Island (at approximately ) is the southernmost island on the lake and is near the eastern shore.
 Bell Island (at approximately ) is one of the Twin Sister islands (the other being Black Island) and is south of Gull Rocks and Black Island.
 Gull Rocks (at approximately ) is north of Bell Island and south of Black Island.
 Black Island (at approximately ) is one of the Twin Sister islands (the other being Bell Island) and is north of Gull Rocks and Bell Island.
 Cove Island (at approximately ) is east of Black Island.

International Islands 

 Province Island (at approximately ) is crossed by the international boundary.   About one tenth of the southern end of the island is in the United States; the remainder is in Canada.

Islands in Canada 

 Tea Table Island (at approximately ) is north-northeast of Province Island, west of Reid Bay, and south of the Cedarville Wharf.
 Round Island (at approximately ) is near the western shore of the lake.
 Whetstone Island (at approximately ) is on the eastern shore at the entrance to Fitch Bay and is south of Gull Island.  It is named for the novaculite oil stone that was mined there.
 Gull Island (at approximately ) is north of Whetstone Island and at the entrance to Fitch Bay.
 Loon Island (at approximately ) is in Fitch Bay.
 Minnow Island (at approximately ) is east of Skinner's island.
 Skinner's Island (at approximately ) is west of Minnow Island and south of Long Island.
 Long Island (at approximately ) is north of Skinner's Island.
 Molson's Island (at approximately ) is on the eastern shore.
 Lord's Island (at approximately ).
 Eagle Island (at approximately ) is north of Hermitage Point and west of Hermitage Bay.
 Charest Island (at approximately ) is the northernmost island on the lake and is in Magog, Quebec.

Hydrology 

Four Vermont rivers directly empty into the lake: the Clyde, Barton, the Black and the Johns River.

The Magog River, in Quebec, drains the lake towards the northeast. The hydroelectric producing Memphemagog Dam, on the Magog River, regulates the water level of the lake. The water level of the lake is governed by a treaty signed in 1935 between the United States and Canada.

Geology 
During the ice age, the lake was a proglacial lake which covered Lake Magog, Lake Brompton, and much of the Saint François watershed including East Angus, Sherbrooke, and Windsor.

Ecology
Like many other lakes, Memphremagog is accumulating phosphorus, sediments, and other pollutants, primarily runoff from farms, but from other sources as well. Exotic species infestations are a concern, with an existing Eurasian water milfoil population and the potential for a zebra mussel infestation. Since the 1970s, significant efforts have been made to reduce the polluting effects of direct discharges into the lake and its tributaries, and lake quality has improved.

In 1994, the Lake Memphremagog Watershed Association was formed to focus on solving lake and river issues. Testing done in 2008 was unable to determine the cause of excessive nitrogen and phosphorus. In 2010, a study revealed that farms contribute disproportionately to nutrient loads. Although farms have 16% of total land use in the drainage area, they produce 44% of the runoff. Baseline nutrients for a lake are 14 micrograms  of phosphorus per litre of water. The lake was measured at 17 micrograms, 18% above the standard. Although the acreage devoted to farming has decreased, the retired land has most often been developed, itself a source of runoff.

Origin of name 
The lake is within the larger territory originally inhabited by the Abenaki tribe.  The lake's name, Memphremagog, is derived from the Algonkian language:
Memphremagog comes from the word Memrahabegek, which means "where there is a big expanse of water".
Memphremagog was also pronounced as "Mamphremagog".  This came from the Abenakis' Mamlawbagak which signifies "a long and large sheet of water".  The prefix mamlaw denotes largeness or abundance; the particule baga denotes water; and "k" marks the name as given in local term.

History 

In 1753, the Abenakis brought the ransomed John Stark down the lake and came ashore where Newport is now.

Rogers' Rangers were forced to retreat south following their attack on Saint-Francis, Quebec in 1759. To confound their avenging pursuers, they split up on the east shore of the lake.

The first accurate depiction of the map was in 1776. This marks the beginning of interest by settlers.

The Mountain Maid paddlewheeler operated from 1850 to 1870. The Lady of the Lake steam excursion/ferry paddlewheeler started operating in 1867. It stopped operations in 1917. It was based in Newport. The Anthemis steamer was built in 1909 to carry 300 people. It stopped operating after 1945.

In June 1942, a single-engined Royal Canadian Air Force training plane crashed into the lake near the west shore near Newport, killing the pilot, Roy N. Pate, its only occupant.

In 2010 the U.S. Fish and Wildlife Service accepted a bequest of  undeveloped land on the shores the lake on Eagle Point along the border with Canada.

In September 2020, a leak at the sewage treatment facility in Newport, Vermont dumped about 7,000 gallons of effluent into the lake.

Memphre 
Lake Memphremagog allegedly contains a cryptid named Memphre (or Memphré), which has received sightings since the 18th century and continues on in the folklore of the area. A sighting of Memphre was reported in 2000.

Lighthouses
Lake Memphremagog is known to have had at least three lighthouses on the Vermont side and seven on the Quebec side.  These were used in aiding boaters in navigating the waters of the large lake.

Vermont lighthouses
All three of the original lighthouses have been demolished.

Maxfield Point Light

The Maxfield Point Light was a small lighthouse constructed on the Vermont side of Lake Memphremagog in 1879.  A conical, cast iron structure, it was 25 feet (7.6 m) tall, with a focal plane 40 feet (12.2 m) above sea level.  It showed a fixed white light, visible for 10 (16 km) miles. The lighthouse no longer exists; it is unknown what happened to it, or when it was deactivated.

Newport Wharf Light
The Newport Wharf Light was a tower that was built in the Newport section of Lake Memphremagog in 1879. The lighthouse was a steel skeleton tower, painted red, that was fixed on a concrete foundation. As with the Maxfield Point Lighthouse, the date this lighthouse was demolished is unknown.

Whipple Point Light
Whipple Point Light was a tower that was built on the end of a pier on Whipple Point in Lake Memphremagog. Built in 1879, the tower was constructed of wood in a hexagonal shape and stood 13 feet (4 m). The lighthouse was deactivated around 1906 and was demolished at an unknown date.

Quebec lighthouses
Most of the Quebec lighthouses were originally established in 1878. None of the original lighthouses have survived, although some of them have been replaced by simple navigation lights.  From north to south, the lighthouses were:

Magog Lighthouse

It was built in 1910 and located near Magog. It was demolished on an unknown date.

Witch Shoal Lighthouse

The original lighthouse was built in 1878 as a  white square wooden tower on a pier. It was rebuilt in 1900. In April 1933, it was destroyed by pressure from the ice caused by the rising level of the lake. It was rebuilt in 1960 as a small metal tower, which was swept away by spring ice in 1978. Since 1980, the mast that replaced it is left in place only from May to October each year. The aid is owned by the Coast Guard and maintained by a private contractor.

Black Point Lighthouse

It was also known as the Green Point Lighthouse. It was built in 1878 as a  white square wooden tower. It was rebuilt in 1914 and is currently in a dilapidated state.

Wadleigh's Point Lighthouse

It was also known as the Bryant Landing Light and was near Austin. In approximately 1914, that was replaced by a square pyramidal skeletal tower with enclosed lantern. In 1939, that was replaced by a  square skeletal tower with enclosed lantern. The still-active light is installed from May to October each year.

Chateau de Silva Lighthouse

It was demolished on an unknown date.

Molson's Island Lighthouse

This was on the eastern side of the lake, near Georgeville. It was rebuilt in 1914 and demolished on an unknown date. The light was replaced with a lighted buoy.

Lead Mines Lighthouse

This was near Leadville, at the foot of Mount Owl's Head. It was rebuilt in 1914 and demolished on an unknown date.

Economy 

The watershed in Vermont is largely agricultural and forest land with residential development increasing in recent years in both Vermont and Quebec.

The lake furnishes potable (drinking) water for 200,000 people.

In 2011 a day cruise ship started summer operations on the Canadian side of the lake.

Sargent's Bay Yacht Club

Sargent's Bay Yacht Club, despite its name, is a small children's dinghy sailing club based out of Sargent's Bay. It operates throughout eight weeks of the summer, hosting up to 40 campers a week, with a staff of five to seven. It was started in 1935 by several families in the bay, with the goal of teaching their children the basics of the sport they all cherished so much, sailing. Since 1935, the Fisher family has graciously allowed the operation of the club to continue on their property.

Popular culture 

Lake Memphremagog is mentioned in a novel by Chris Bohjalian, Close Your Eyes, Hold Hands, in which the lake is the site of a nuclear reactor that has suffered a cataclysmic meltdown.

Lake Memphremagog is mentioned in Northwest Passage, a historical novel by Kenneth Roberts about the 1759 Rogers' Rangers raid.  In Northwest Passage, the 1940 film based on the novel, Spencer Tracy uses a map that shows Lake Memphremagog and the environs.

The 1986 film The Decline of the American Empire was shot at Lake Memphremagog from September to October 1985.

The Canadian band The Tragically Hip mentions Lake Memphremagog in their 2002 unreleased song "Problem Bears", part of their In Violet Light album sessions.

Lake Memphremagog was mentioned and depicted in Disappearances, a 2006 film by director Jay Craven starring Kris Kristofferson, and co-starring Charlie McDermott and Geneviève Bujold.

Fictional versions of the lake appear in Howard Frank Mosher's books about the Northeast Kingdom of Vermont, including God's Kingdom (St. Martin's Press, 2015).

Lake Memphremagog was the setting for the climactic scene in Kenneth Butler's satiric novel Holy Fool (TouchPoint Press, 2015).

See also
Memphre (Lake Monster)

References

Further reading

External links 

Memphremagog Conservation
Lake Memphremagog, Coaticook & Tomifobia Rivers Basin Planning
The International Dracontology Society of Lake Memphremagog
Lake Memphremagog (YouTube) - Abbott Productions

 
Derby, Vermont
Lakes of Estrie
Magog, Quebec
Newport (city), Vermont
Newport (town), Vermont
Vermont culture
Canada–United States border
International lakes of North America
Glacial lakes of the United States
Glacial lakes of Canada
Lakes of Orleans County, Vermont
Tributaries of the Saint Lawrence River
Tourist attractions in Estrie
Northern Forest Canoe Trail
Vermont placenames of Native American origin